Calving may refer to:
Calving, the process of giving birth to a calf
Ice calving, the process by which an iceberg breaks off from an ice shelf or glacier